An election to Donegal County Council took place on 20 June 1985 as part of that year's Irish local elections. 29 councillors were elected from six electoral divisions by PR-STV voting for a five-year term of office.

Results by party

Results by Electoral Area
 Sitting in italics

Buncrana

Donegal

Glenties

Letterkenny

Milford

External links
Official website
Irishelectionliterature

1985 Irish local elections
1985